The Linhousilin Forest Park is a park in Chaozhou Township, Pingtung County, Taiwan.

History
The establishment plan of the park started by the i-Taiwan 12 Projects launched by the government in 2009. The park was inaugurated on 14 June 2014 with the first stage of the park covers an area of 85 hectares.

Geology
The park was created as a lowland forest reserve. It spans over a total area of 1,005 hectares.

Architecture
The park features modern art exhibitions.

Controversy
Despite the fact that Taiwan operates an effective national rabies vaccination and certification program for pet dogs Linhousilin Forest Park along with other areas managed by the Forestry Bureau previously prohibited families from bringing pet dogs into the park, even if vaccinated and carrying the correct collar tag, threatening park visitors with a fine of up to NT$300,000 (approx US$10,000).

The policy was repealed in spring 2021, and dogs wearing the current year's anti-rabies vaccine tag may enter the park.

See also
 List of parks in Taiwan

References

External links
 

2014 establishments in Taiwan
Forest parks in Taiwan
Geography of Pingtung County
Parks established in 2014
Tourist attractions in Pingtung County
Parks in Pingtung County